Fawaz Al-Torais (born 24 April 1997) is a Saudi Arabian football player who plays as a winger for Pro League side Al-Adalah on loan from Al-Hilal.

Career
Al-Torais is an academy graduate of Al-Ettifaq and signed his first professional contract with the club on September 5, 2016. He made his debut for the first team on November 16, 2017, during the league match against Ohod. On June 2, 2018, Al-Torais was loaned to MS League side Al-Khaleej for the 2018–19 season. On October 14, 2020, Al-Torais signed with Al-Hilal. On 24 August 2021, Al-Torais joined Al-Fayha on loan. On 20 August 2022, Al-Torais joined newly promoted side Al-Adalah on loan.

Career statistics

Club

Honours

Club
Al-Hilal
Saudi Professional League: 2020–21
King Cup: 2019–20

Al-Fayha
King Cup: 2021–22

References

External links
 

1997 births
Living people
People from Khobar
Saudi Arabian footballers
Saudi Arabia youth international footballers
Association football wingers
Saudi Professional League players
Saudi First Division League players
Ettifaq FC players
Khaleej FC players
Al Hilal SFC players
Al-Fayha FC players
Al-Adalah FC players